The Four Horsemen was a sound poetry group of Canadian poets composed of bpNichol, Rafael Barreto-Rivera, Paul Dutton and Steve McCaffery that also performed concrete poetry. The group was active from 1972 to 1988.
They released 2 12-inch vinyl records of their collaborative sound poetry (Nada Canadada, 1972; Live in the West, 1977), 2 cassettes (Bootleg, 1981; 2 Nights, 1988), as well as 3 print collections (Horse d'Oeuvres, 1977; A Little Nastiness, 1980; The Prose Tattoo, 1983 ) & the unique broadside Schedule For Another Place (1981). The Four Horsemen also appeared in Ron Mann's 1982 documentary film Poetry in Motion.

They were Canada's first sound poetry ensemble, leading directly to the formation of at least 3 further groups: Owen Sound in Toronto (Michael Dean, David Penhale, Steven Ross Smith, Richard Truhlar), Re:Sounding in Edmonton (Douglas Barbour, Stephen Scobie) & Quatuor Gualuor in Ottawa (currently consisting of director jwcurry, Conyer Clayton, Nina Drystek, Chris Johnson & Alastair Larwill).

References

Sound poets
Canadian poetry